Karić is a surname of South Slavic origins. 

Notable people with the surname include:

Amir Karić (born 1973), Slovenian footballer of Bosnian descent
Ana Karić (1941–2014), Croatian actress
Benjamina Karić (born 1991), Bosnian politician
Bogoljub Karić (born 1954), Serbian businessman and politician
Denis Karić (born 1972), Bosnian footballer
Dragomir Karić (born 1949), Serbian entrepreneur and politician, brother of Bogoljub Karić
Emir Karic (born 1997), Austrian footballer
Enes Karić (born 1958), Bosnian Islamic scholar
Elena Karaman Karić (born 1971), Serbian interior designer
Ivan Karić (born 1975), Serbian politician
Mahir Karić (born 1992), Bosnian footballer
Milanka Karić (born 1957), Serbian politician, wife of Bogoljub Karić
Nermin Karić (born 1999), Swedish footballer
Pol Popovic Karic (born 1962), Serbian-Spanish professor
Sven Karič (born 1998), Slovenian footballer, son of Amir Karić
Vedad Karic (born 1988), Bosnian mountain biker and road cyclist
Veldin Karić (born 1974), Croatian footballer
Velimir Karić (1859–1946), Serbian revolutionary
Vladimir Karić (1848-1894), Serbian geographer, pedagogue, publicist and diplomat
Zoran Karić (born 1961), Serbian footballer

Surnames
Bosnian surnames
Croatian surnames
Serbian surnames